Loule may refer to:

Loulé, Portugal
Loule, Guinea